Roadies: Journey in South Africa is the Eighteenth season of India MTV Roadies produced by Pippip Media Private Limited. It premiered on MTV on 8 April 2022.

A spin-off series, Roadies - All Access Star hosted by Gaelyn Mendonca and judged by Arjun Kanungo streamed exclusively on Voot. Participants will have to showcase their talent and even showcase their flair for general knowledge. The winner Nisman Parpia gets a fully paid five-day trip to South Africa, the opportunity to host her own digital show, witnessing the Roadies finale shoot and also gets an opportunity to host a Roadies after hours digital show.

Like the previous season, the show was being streamed on Voot 24 hours before TV, exclusively available only to Voot Select subscribers.In addition to airing on MTV India, the premiere episode was simulcast across three other channels of Viacom18; Colors Infinity, Comedy Central India and MTV Beats, becoming the most-watched episode in the franchise's history.

On 10 July 2022, Ashish Bhatia & Nandini G emerged as winners of the season, and for first time in the history there were two winners. Jashwanth Bopanna & Yukti Arora were 1st runners-up and Kevin Almasifar & Moose Jattana were 2nd runners-up.

Format
Unlike previous seasons, Season 18 had Ex-Roadies and Debutant Roadies competing against each other in Buddy Pairs.
Bikes were introduced again as journey vehicle. A special currency Roadiums were also introduced which will help the Roadies in the journey. There were tasks, vote outs, vote ins, immunity, eliminations, wildcards and various twists.

Roadies
 Roadies in chronological order of their introduction.

Journey overview
The journey started with Ex-Roadies having a welcome meal and meeting other Ex-Roadies in Amakhala Game Reserve Location.The debutee Roadies were welcomed by Francois Van Niekerk (Local Guide) at the Port Elizabeth Airport giving them the first scroll, which gave them the Welcome Task.

Welcome Task!
Before this Task, the new Roadies had to divide themselves into 3 teams, each team were given a clue to solve leading to the next clue.

After the Task, debutee Roadies reached Amakhala Game Reserve Location and meet the ex-roadies.

Buddy Pairs Twist
Each pair needed to have 1 new roadie & 1 ex-roadie. The new roadies had to impress the ex-roadies by auditioning process. There was also a condition that one 'buddy' from a pair should have known riding. 

Later, Sonu Sood entered and finalized the buddy pairs And also introduced to a new point system called "Roadium", which will help the roadies in the game.

First Task: Rugby In Water
This task were played in 2 teams with 5 buddy pairs on each team, playing a water version of rugby. The team with most goals will win and earn immunity & Roadiums.

Team Loyalty won and received 2 immunity for any 2 pairs & 3000 Roadiums for 3 other pairs. Arushi C & Arshvir and Sohil & Simi took the immunity.

Later in the first Vote-out, Sapna & Angad and Kavya & Sidharth received the highest number of votes, but they received an opportunity to return back to the back by winning the Survival Task.

The first buddy pair with 5000 Roadiums will be safe, these Roadiums can be earned by winning task or get it from fellow Roadies.

Second Task: Recuse Adventure 
This task were played in 2 teams with voted-out buddy pair as Captains and 4 safe buddy pairs on each team. At each checkpoint in the adventure they will earn 1500 Roadiums.

Kavya & Sidharth received 5000 Roadiums and were safe. Sapna & Angad failed to receive 5000 Roadiums and were eliminated.

Third Task: Rug Rug Mein Rugby
Sonu Sood introduced The Greater Wall of Africa Rugby Team.

This task were played in 2 teams with 4 buddy pairs on each team, playing rugby. The team with most goals will win and earn immunity & Roadiums.

Before the Task, 1 buddy pair had to sit-out and not compete in this Task. This was decided by a kick off game. Yukti & Nandini lost it and didn't compete with any team.

Team Boom Bruh won and received 2 immunity for 2 pairs & 1000 Roadiums for 2 other pairs each. Arushi C & Arshvir and Kevin & Soundous took the immunity.

Fourth Task: Coin Switch Surf-fari
Only non-immune buddy pairs compete in this task, one of them had to surf and other had to invest Roadiums on their performance.

Yukti & Nandini got 5 times their invest, Gaurav & Moose got double their invest, Kavya & Sidharth got to keep their investment and all others lost their invested Roadiums.

Gaurav & Moose borrowed Roadiums from other buddy pairs, they used 4000 Roadiums and earned immunity.Gaurav & Moose took the immunity.

Later in the second Vote-out, Aarushi D & Tanish received the highest number of votes and were voted-out.

Fifth Task: Rowing Adventure
This task were played in 2 teams with buddy pairs with highest Roadiums as Captains and 3 other buddy pairs on each team. The winning team will earn immunity & Roadiums.

Riddles at each Checkpoint forming final code to open the chest.

Team B won and received 1 immunity for 1 pair & 1000 Roadiums for 3 other pairs each. Ashish & Sakshi took the immunity.

Sixth Task: Get! Set! Fly!
Before the Task, all buddy pairs except for Ashish & Sakshi took part in an African Dance, were the locals choose the order on who was doing the best. Arushi C & Arshvir were not chosen and therefore, had to stay back at the campsite.

Each buddy pair had to Bungee Jump from Bloukrans Bridge which is 216m (708 Ft) and memorize a set of animal statues and rearrange it after bungee jumping.

Baseer & Jaswanth won immunity and a special power to give a Roadie. They gave it to Nandini.

Sohil & Simi and Gaurav & Moose received 500 Roadiums.

Later in the third Vote-out, Ashish & Sakshi and Baseer & Jaswanth had the power to mutually choose one buddy pair to be immune. They chose Arushi C & Arshvir. Gaurav & Moose received the highest number of votes and were voted-out.

Seventh Task: Sand Dunk
Before the Task, all buddy pairs took part in solving a crossword puzzle. Once solved they moved-on to the task site.

Two buddy pairs faced-off in sand boarding and had to collect flags. The buddy pair in each round will move onto Stage 2.

Each buddy pair had 3 balls (2 basket balls & 1 golden basket ball) had to shoot making a goal earning points.

Baseer & Jaswanth won immunity.

Eighth Task: Nach na is Nicena 
Each buddy pair had to perform a bollywood dance number in front of the African public and actor Edrien Erasmus as judge.

Ashish & Sakshi won immunity.

Baseer & Jaswanth and Ashish & Sakshi went on a boat sail to relax and enjoy South Africa.

Later in the fourth Vote-out, Baseer & Jaswanth and Ashish & Sakshi had the power to each choose one buddy pair to be safe, which will be revelaed after votes are counted. They chose Kevin & Soundous and Sohil & Simi respectively and all vote against them were cancelled. Yukti & Nandini received the highest number of votes and were voted-out, but they received an opportunity to return back if they get all Roadiums from 3 buddy pairs. They received all Roadiums from Sohil & Simi, Ashish & Sakshi and Kevin & Soundous and Yukti & Nandini were safe, therefore all these buddy pairs now had 0 Roadiums.

Ninth Task: Aata Maze Satakli
This task were played in 2 teams with buddy pairs with highest Roadiums as Captains and 3 other buddy pairs on each team. The winning team will earn immunity & Roadiums.

Before the Task, 1 buddy pair not chosen by Captains will not compete in this Task. Sohil & Simi were not chosen & didn't get to compete.

Kevin & Soundous took immunity. Arushi C & Arshvir and Ashish & Sakshi received 1000 Roadiums.

Tenth Task: Andaaz Apna Apna 
Each buddy pair had to feed Ostrich, get a code from the bottom of the bowl. Then move to the next checkpoint, collect 4 eggs and drink an Ostrich egg.

Kavya & Sidharth won immunity. Yukti & Nandini received 1000 Roadiums.

Kevin & Soundous got 500 Roadiums for Soundous drinking Ostrich egg.

Later in the fifth Vote-out, Sohil & Simmi received the highest number of votes to vote-out but Arushi C & Arsh received least votes to save and were voted-out.

Eleventh Task: Gufa mai Guftagoo 
Each buddy pair had a different clue to go to the location of the task.

This task were played in 2 teams with the buddy pair who reached to the task location the fastest got to choose 2 other buddy pairs to be on their team. The winning team will earn immunity & Roadiums.

Ashish & Sakshi won immunity. Yukti & Nandini were directly in danger zone.

Sapna & Angad and Aarushi D & Tanish returned back to the game.

At a surprise vote-out, Roadies were not voting-out instead were voting for one buddy pair to be in danger zone with Yukti & Nandini. Sapna & Angad received the highest number of votes but were in danger zone.

Twelfth Task: Chal Putle 
This task were played by 2 danger zone buddy pairs and 1 safe buddy pairs to support them. They had to collect mannequins and delivered them.

Yukti & Nandini won and were safe and Sapna & Angad lost and were eliminated.

Thirteenth Task: Zindagi Na Milegi Gu-bara 
As Kevin and Tanish were sick and didn't go to the task location. Therefore, Aarushi D and Soundous were a buddy pair for this task.

This task buddy pairs had to collect elephant dung and had to eat elephant's favorite rice ball.

Ashish & Sakshi won immunity.

Sohil & Simi got 500 Roadiums for Simi drinking elephant dung juice.

Fourteenth Task: Cl-uff Hanger 
For this task also, Aarushi D and Soundous were a buddy pair for this task.

This task buddy pairs had to collect gem stones as they abseil down a waterfall from the cliff.

Baseer & Jaswanth won immunity. Aarushi D & Soundous received 1000 Roadiums (500 Roadiums each).

And Kevin and Tanish were feeling better and joined back in the journey.

Biding for Immunity 
Buddy pairs got a chance to bid their Roadiums to get immunity.

Kevin & Soundous got immunity for 3100 Roadiums.

Later in the seventh Vote-out, Roadies had to vote-out one Ex-Roadie and one New Roadie, not needed to be a buddy pair. Tanish from New Roadies and Kavya from Ex-Roadies received the highest number of votes and were voted-out.

Buddy Pairs Resuffle
The current buddy pairs had the chance to resuffle their pairs. Each pair still needed to have 1 new roadie & 1 ex-roadie.

Gaurav & Moose and Arushi C & Arshvir were back in the game and couldn't be paired-up as buddy pair again.

Roadies were unable to come to a conclusion and therefore, were paired up by Sonu Sood.

Fifteenth Task: Bum-chiki-chiki-bum 
Baseer & Soundous didn't agree with the new buddy pairing and decided not to compete.

This task buddy pairs had to ride bicycles through a circuit doing stunts. 

Each buddy pair who performed the stunt and got the advantage, each received 500 Roadiums.

Ashish & Nandini won immunity. Sohil & Sidharth received 1000 Roadiums.

Sixteenth Task: Barrel ki Barfi 
Each buddy pair had to convert English word into Hindi word, to go to the task location.

Gaurav & Simi received 500 Roadiums for correctly anserwing the most words.

This task were played in 2 teams with the buddy pair who came in 1st & 2nd place choose 2 other buddy pairs to be on their team. The winning team will win 2 immunities & Roadiums.

Arushi C & Sakshi were not chosen to be in any of the team and did not compete.

Sohil & Sidharth and Baseer & Soundous won immunity. Kevin & Moose received 1000 Roadiums.

Later in the eighth Vote-out, Roadies had to vote-out one buddy pair. Arushi C & Sakshi received the highest number of votes and were voted-out.

Seventeenth Task: Tai - Tai Fish 
Before the Task each buddy pair received 500 Roadiums.

In Part-1 of the task buddy pairs had to bid for box filled with fish. And in Part-2 they had to segregate and pack the fishes. 

Ashish & Nandini won immunity and received 500 Roadiums. Kevin & Moose  won immunity. Aarushi D & Jaswanth received 1000 Roadiums.

Fun Task: Hoop Hoop Hurray! 
This was a fun task to earn Roadiums.

Eighteenth Task: Ball Baby Ball 
This task were played in 2 teams with the 2 immune buddy pair as captains.

ke beech

Yukti & Arshvir were not chosen to be in any of the team and did not compete.

Ashish & Nandini received 1000 Roadiums. Aarushi D & Jaswanth got immunity and Sohil & Sidharth got 500 Roadiums.

Later in the ninth Vote-out, only 1 Roadie from each buddy pairs could vote on behalf of themselves & on behalf of their buddy pair. Buddy pairs with atleast 1 vote against them were in danger zone, but they had to guess which buddy pairs have vote for them. Based on the correct guesses, those votes were cancelled. All buddy pairs guessed it correct, and as Baseer & Soundous received highest votes they were voted-out.

Eighteenth Task: Beach ke beech mai 
This task were played in 2 teams with buddy pairs with highest Roadiums as Captains and 3 other buddy pairs on each team. The winning team will earn immunity & Roadiums.

The entire winning team won immunity - Ashish & Nandini, Kevin & Moose and Gaurav & Simi.

Nineteenth Task: Hai Hooku Hai Hooku Hai Hai 
Before the task, there was a surprise open Vote-out, Roadies had to vote-out one Ex-Roadie and one New Roadie, not needed to be a buddy pair. Arshvir from New Roadies and Aarushi D from Ex-Roadies received the highest number of votes and were voted-out. Yukti & Jaswanth became the new buddy pair.

In this task, buddy pairs had to sky-dive & memorize a series to solve the puzzle on the ground. The last place buddy pair will get eliminated.

Kevin & Moose won the task and received an advantage "Ticket to Finale".

Sohil & Sidharth lost the task and were eliminated.

Twentieth Task: Roadies da Dhaba 
In this task, buddy pairs had to cook for the Cape Town public & Chef Leroux Botha and sell. 

Gaurav & Simi won the task and received an advantage in the next task.

Twenty-First Task: Main Nikla Quad-i Lekar 
The Roadies reach the Atlantis Dunes for this Semi-Finale Task involving Quad biking. Gaurav & Simi got a one-minute advantage for winning the previous task. The losing buddy pair will get eliminated. 

Ashish & Nandini and Yukti & Jaswanth won the task and became Finalists.

Gaurav & Simi lost the task and were eliminated.

Twenty-Second Task: Finale Task 
Before the Task, all eliminated and voted-out Roadies returned to support the finalists.

Each buddy pair had an amount of Roadiums set to invest on Roadies, the finalist buddy pairs had to spend & take their support in the task.
Roadiums could also be used for Time Advantage of 15 seconds for 500 Roadiums. 

Ashish and Nandini won and became the winners of Roadies: Journey to South Africa'''.

Roadium Score Board

Vote Out Order

 indicates Ex Roadies
 indicates New Roadies
 indicates Winner(s)
 indicates 1st Runner Up(s)
 indicates 2nd Runner Up(s)

Notes

Voting History

Notes

References

External links 
 Episodes on Voot
 Web Episodes on Voot
 MTV Roadies On MXPlayer

MTV Roadies
2022 Indian television seasons